Ratko Dujković (born 16 March 1983) is a Bosnian-Herzegovinian retired footballer who last played as goalkeeper for NK Čelik Zenica.

Dujković was voted the best goalkeeper of the 2014–15 Premier League of Bosnia and Herzegovina season.

Club career
Dujković started playing when he was 10 at FK Sloga Doboj. When he was a student, he was studying Tourism when he signed his first professional contract with Serbian side OFK Kikinda and that was a starting point of his definitive career as professional footballer. Later he played with Bosnian side FK Sloboda Tuzla before joining FK Slavija Sarajevo where he spent seven years.

Honours

Club

Zrinjski Mostar
Premier Liga: 2013–14

References

External links

1983 births
Living people
People from Doboj
Serbs of Bosnia and Herzegovina
Association football goalkeepers
Bosnia and Herzegovina footballers
OFK Kikinda players
FK Sloboda Tuzla players
FK Slavija Sarajevo players
HŠK Zrinjski Mostar players
Saipa F.C. players
FK Olimpik players
NK Čelik Zenica players
FK Rudar Kakanj players
Premier League of Bosnia and Herzegovina players
Persian Gulf Pro League players
Bosnia and Herzegovina expatriate footballers
Expatriate footballers in Serbia and Montenegro
Bosnia and Herzegovina expatriate sportspeople in Serbia and Montenegro
Expatriate footballers in Iran
Bosnia and Herzegovina expatriate sportspeople in Iran